This is a list of All Elite Wrestling professional wrestling tournaments competed for by professional wrestlers that are part of their roster.

Tournaments

AEW World Tag Team Championship Tournament

AEW World Championship #1 Contender Tournament

TNT Championship Tournament

AEW Women's Tag Team Cup Tournament: The Deadly Draw

On the July 22, 2020 episode of Dynamite, AEW announced a women's tag team tournament consisting of eight teams that would begin that summer. The winning team would be awarded the tournament cup trophy. The rules of the tournament were that all 16 women had to draw a random color with the matching colors becoming a team; all selections were final. 

This concept is similar to World Championship Wrestling's BattleBowl tournament where the teams were drawn at random in a "Lethal Lottery". The tournament began on August 3, 2020, airing on AEW's YouTube channel, and concluded on the August 22 special episode Saturday Night Dynamite.

AEW World Championship Eliminator Tournament (2020)

AEW Women's World Championship Eliminator Tournament

AEW World Tag Team Championship Eliminator Tournament

AEW World Championship Eliminator Tournament (2021)

AEW TBS Championship Tournament

Owen Hart Cup

All-Atlantic Championship Tournament

AEW Interim World Championship Eliminator Series

AEW World Trios Championship Tournament

AEW Grand Slam Tournament of Champions

AEW World Championship Eliminator Tournament (2022)

References

External links

Tournaments
Professional wrestling-related lists
All Elite Wrestling